The 1966 South Dakota gubernatorial election was held on November 8, 1966.

Incumbent Republican Governor Nils Boe defeated Democratic nominee Robert Chamberlin with 57.71% of the vote.

Primary elections
Primary elections were held on June 7, 1966.

Democratic primary

Candidates
Robert Chamberlin, State Representative

Results

Republican primary

Candidates
Nils Boe, incumbent Governor

Results

General election

Candidates
Robert Chamberlin, Democratic
Nils Boe, Republican

Results

References

Bibliography
 
 

1966
South Dakota
Gubernatorial
November 1966 events in the United States